Lulu's Islands (originally Lulu la Peste) is an animated series for children that premiered on 5 October 2009, on the TFOU block of France's TF1 network. It is produced by Interactive Project 4 You (IP4U) of Valenciennes and Patoon-Animation of Paris. The show uses cutout animation for its style, and is targeted to young viewers.

Synopsis
Animals of various species live happily on an untouched archipelago called the Wonderlees. One day, everything changes when a kitten named Lulu meets the first human ever to land on their shores: Peppy (or Pépin), a young shipwreck survivor turned castaway.

Characters
 Lulu, a mischievous tomboy cat, and the show's heroine
 Romeo, a baby elephant
 Erik (Eric), a maned wolf cub
 Simone, a french bulldog
 Isabelle, a giraffe, and the teacher of the children
 Peppy (Pépin), the boy who gets stranded on the Wonderlees

Cast 

 Lizzie Waterworth - Peppy
 Jules de Jongh - Lulu and Erik
 Joanna Ruiz - Romeo and Simone
 Harriet Carmichael - Pipa and Isabelle
 Eric Meyers - Daddycat, Badjijaba, Bartolo
 Fabrice Ziolkowski - Dr. Button

Production
Lulu's Islands began development at Paris' HLC Productions in 2005 under the title Lulu la Peste, at a cost of €137,000. By 2008, the budget had grown to €2,931,000.

Production of the new series involves at least three crew members of another TF1 animated series, The Bellflower Bunnies: Eric Berthier, the director of Bellflower's 2nd and 3rd seasons; screenwriter Valérie Baranski; and producer Patricia Robert, who in March 2008 set up Patoon-Animation exclusively for the new show. Pierre Gillet, from the Belgian music and post-production outlet Dame Blanche, will serve as composer.

Episodes

Lulu's Islands consists of a planned 52 episodes, in addition to a four-minute pilot that was shown as an official selection at the Annecy International Animation Festival in June 2008.

Merchandise
There will also be tie-in books based on the series, although further details have not been announced since early 2008.

References

External links

  

2009 French television series debuts
2000s French animated television series
2010s French animated television series
French children's animated adventure television series
Fictional archipelagoes
French flash animated television series
Animated television series about cats
Animated television series about children
Animated television series about elephants